Ramesh Selvaraj (born 13 December 1982) is a Sri Lankan cricketer. He made his first-class debut on 9 December 2016, for Kalutara Physical Culture Club in Tier B of the 2016–17 Premier League Tournament. He made his Twenty20 debut on 4 January 2020, for Kalutara Town Club in the 2019–20 SLC Twenty20 Tournament.

References

External links
 

1982 births
Living people
Sri Lankan cricketers
Kalutara Physical Culture Centre cricketers
Kalutara Town Club cricketers